The XM1111 Mid-Range Munition (MRM) is a 120 mm precision guided munition developed for the Rheinmetall Rh-120 120mm gun (named the M256 in the US military) used by several Western tanks. It was also intended to fulfill a requirement for Future Combat Systems (canceled) for a long-range, beyond line of sight (BLOS) tank munition.

The U.S. Army awarded two contracts in a competition to validate the requirement, one for a kinetic energy penetrator round (MRM-KE) and one for a chemical energy high-explosive anti-tank (HEAT) warhead round (MRM-CE).

In December 2007, Raytheon's CE-based concept was awarded the system-design-and-development contract to develop the round. Valued at $232.3 million, the 63-month contract covered system design and development.

The Mid-Range Munition was cancelled in 2009 along with Future Combat Systems.

MRM-KE
The Mid-Range Munition-Kinetic Energy (MRM-KE) was an implementation of the MRM under development by Alliant Techsystems, Lockheed Martin, BAE Systems, and HR Textron.

The missile–projectile was designed to be used as a high-velocity penetrator for line of sight and beyond line of sight shots. In line of sight, it would operate using laser guidance or a millimeter wave seeker. In BLOS, the shell would be fired in a ballistic arc, and would seek out its own target.

The missile used a kinetic energy penetrator to penetrate enemy armor. This effect was improved by a rocket motor that sped the munition up. It steered with impulse thrusters.

MRM-KE used technology developed as part of the X-Rod and XM1007 Tank Extended Range Munition (TERM) programs, both of which were cancelled.

Timeline
 April 2004: Successful test firing of the system.
 May 2006: Successful high Mach flight maneuver test at Yuma Proving Ground.
 July 2007: ATK Forms "Team MRM" to compete for the U.S. Army's XM1111 Mid-Range Munition Program.

MRM-CE
The missile–projectile was to be a high-velocity multiple-mission projectile for line-of-sight and beyond-line-of-sight shots. In line of sight, it would operate using laser guidance or an uncooled imaging infrared seeker (IIR). In BLOS, the shell would be fired in a ballistic arc, and would glide to seek out its own targets. The BLOS mission could be autonomous or use FO directed target designation.

The MRM-CE uses a dual-mode MMW, imaging infrared (IIR) autonomous seeker or SAL is used to acquire and guide towards the target with high accuracy. The dual-mode seeker was developed and successfully demonstrated during a two-year, Army-managed science and technology program. MRM-CE refined seeker technology developed as part of the XM1007 Tank Extended Range Munition (TERM) program.

For a beyond-line-of-sight mission, the chemical energy warhead was a better solution; with proven lethality against the primary target of threat armor, and better effects against the secondary targets of buildings, fortifications, and light armor than a less versatile kinetic energy penetrator.

Specifications
 Warhead: Shaped charge HEAT.
 Guidance: Dual-mode MMW – imaging infrared homing or semi-active laser guidance.

Program status
 September 2006: A U.S. M1 Abrams tank fired an MRM-CE round which hit a moving T-72 tank at a range of  meters.
 March 2007: Successful test firing using dual-mode seeker fusion.
 December 2007: Raytheon Wins Army XM-1111 Development Contract.

See also 
List of gun-launched missiles
M982 Excalibur, 155 mm extended range guided artillery shell

References

External links 
 More ammo for US Army - The Engineer Online
 MRM - Deagel 
 MRM - Global Security
 Missile Systems - Precision Guided Projectiles - Raytheon

Anti-tank weapons
Anti-tank rounds